The Egyptian national futsal team represents Egypt during international futsal competitions. It is governed by the Egyptian Football Association and won the Africa Futsal Cup of Nations a record three times. They have also represented Africa in the FIFA Futsal World Cup, with seven appearances.

Results and fixtures

The following is a list of match results in the last 12 months, as well as any future matches that have been scheduled.
Legend

2021

2022

2023

Team
Head coach:  Hesham Saleh

Current squad

Competitive record
*Denotes draws include knockout matches decided on penalty kicks.
**Gold background color indicates that the tournament was won.***Red border color indicates tournament was held on home soil.''

FIFA Futsal World Cup
Egypt has reached the FIFA Futsal World Cup 7 times, the most in Africa. Egypt attended their first FIFA Futsal World Cup in 1996, when they achieved the first victory for Africa in the competition's history by beating Australia 8–2. Four years later, they reached the Second Round with notable victories over the likes of teams like Uruguay and Russia. Although a draw with Argentina would have granted them a place in the Semi-finals, they lost 3–4 to the Argentina  and finished 6th place overall.

The Pharaohs appeared for the third successive time in Chinese Taipei and despite a first-round exit, they made their mark with the biggest margin of victory in the tournament, 12–0 over the hosts.

Egypt didn't pass through the group stage again in 2008 but they progressed through the first round in 2012, losing to Italy 1-5.

Egypt appeared in the Quarterfinals in the 2016 edition, after a 4-3 revenge win against Italy in Extra Time. They would later lose to the eventual winners, Argentina. Egypt qualified to their 7th world cup appearance after reaching the final in the 2020 Africa Futsal Cup.

Africa Futsal Cup of Nations
Egypt has reached the final match of every tournament.

Grand Prix de Futsal
Egypt were only invited twice.

Futsal Confederations Cup

Arab Futsal Championship

References

African national futsal teams
Futsal
Futsal in Egypt